Joint Helicopter Command (JHC) is a tri-service organisation uniting battlefield military helicopters of the British Armed Forces for command and coordination purposes.

History

Background 

Over the years, the grouping of all battlefield support helicopters operated by the Fleet Air Arm, Army Air Corps and Royal Air Force into one of the services had been discussed, however the Ministry of Defence (MOD) believed that any advantages would be outweighed by the damaging impact such a re-organisation would have on ethos, morale and operational effectiveness.

The Strategic Defence Review (SDR), published by the MOD in July 1998, announced that a Joint Helicopter Command (JHC) would be formed, which would deliver training, standards, doctrinal development and support for operations in order to maximise the availability of battlefield helicopters and reinforce their growing importance in military operations. JHC would be a tri-Service organisation, with personnel remaining part of their parent service. The formation of JHC was considered by the MOD as one of the most important initiatives to result from the SDR. The command was expected to draw on the equipment, personnel and expertise of the single services and be charged with providing the Joint Force Commander tailored packages of battlefield helicopters (from one or more service), support equipment and personnel, to meet operational requirements. The MOD's intention was to provide a single focus for the transfer of best practice from service to service and for removing, over time, differences in extant operating procedures.

A Joint Helicopter Command Study Team was established to determine how JHC should operate. Four options for the location of JHC Headquarters were also examined, with RNAS Yeovilton in Somerset, AAC Netheravon in Wiltshire, HQ Land Command at Erskine Barracks in Wiltshire and RAF Benson in Oxfordshire, being considered for the role.

Establishment 

Joint Helicopter Command was formed on 5 October 1999, bringing together the Navy's commando helicopters, the Army's attack and light utility helicopters, and the RAF's support helicopters. The Royal Navy's anti-surface warfare, anti-submarine warfare and airborne early warning helicopters, and RN and RAF search and rescue helicopters, were not included in JHC and remained under the control of the respective services. JHC Headquarters was established alongside HQ Land Command at Erskine Barracks, with Air-Vice Marshal David Niven being the inaugural commander.

In 2007, JHC had over 15,000 personnel under its command, some 8,000 of who were part of 16 Air Assault Brigade This included over 900 volunteer reserves from the Territorial Army and Royal Auxiliary Air Force, and 380 MOD civilians.

Joint Helicopter Command's largest operation to date has been Operation Telic, the invasion of Iraq. Following the invasion, Joint Helicopter Command maintained units in Iraq, in support of British and coalition forces deployed there. Another detachment was also maintained in Afghanistan, as part of Operation Herrick.

Role and operations 
The majority of the United Kingdom's military helicopters come under JHC, although exceptions include the Royal Navy's anti-surface warfare, anti-submarine warfare and airborne early warning  helicopters and the Defence Helicopter Flying School.

Command

Air-Vice Marshal Nigel Colman became commander of Joint Helicopter Command in March 2020. JHC is part of Army Headquarters and has its headquarters at the British Army's Marlborough Lines, Andover in Hampshire.

Joint Helicopter Force (US)

Since 2009, the US Navy station Naval Air Facility El Centro (NAFEC) in California has been home to Joint Helicopter Force (US), an element of JHC which provides pre-deployment and desert environmental qualification training. The deserts of Southern California have temperatures and terrain closely resembling those of Afghanistan, Iraq and Libya, where British helicopters have been on operational duty in recent years.

Former Deployments

Joint Helicopter Force (Northern Ireland)
The JHC operation in Northern Ireland in support of the Police Service of Northern Ireland and military units as part of Operation Banner and later Operation Helvetic was named the Joint Helicopter Force Northern Ireland (JHF(NI)). JHF(NI) consisted of the following units based at JHC Flying Station Aldergrove: 
 5 Regiment
No. 655 Squadron – Westland Lynx AH1
No. 665 Squadron – Gazelle AH1
 Reconnaissance, Intelligence and Geographic Centre (Northern Ireland)
 No. 230 Squadron – Westland Puma HC1

Joint Helicopter Force (Iraq)
The JHC operation in Iraq as part of Operation Telic was named Joint Helicopter Force Iraq (JHF(I)).

The following aircraft types served with JHF(I):

 Boeing Chinook HC2s.
 Westland Sea King HC4s.
 Westland Lynx AH7/AH9s.
 Westland Gazelle AH1s.
 Westland Puma HC1s.
 Westland Merlin HC3s.

Joint Helicopter Force (Afghanistan)
The JHC operation in Afghanistan as part of Operation Herrick was named Joint Helicopter Force Afghanistan (JHF(A)) "Task Force Jaguar".

The following aircraft types served with JHF(A):

 AgustaWestland Apache AH1s.
 Boeing Chinook HC2s.
 Westland Lynx AH7, AH9 & AH9As.
 Westland Merlin HC3s.
 Westland Puma HC1s.
 Westland Sea King HC4+ from November 2007 & ASaC7s

Organisation
An overview of formations from each service under Joint Helicopter Command.

British Army 
Army Air Corps

Army Aviation Centre (AACen) (Middle Wallop)
2 (Training) Regiment – Ground crew training
No. 668 (Training) Squadron
No. 676 Squadron
 7 (Training) Regiment – Flight crew training
No. 670 Squadron
No. 671 Squadron – Gazelle AH1 and Bell 212
No. 673 Squadron – Apache AH1

Royal Artillery

47th Regiment Royal Artillery (Horne Barracks, Larkhill) 
 10 (Assaye) Battery – Watchkeeper WK450
 31 (Headquarters) Battery
 43 Battery (Lloyd's Company) – Watchkeeper WK450
 74 Battery (The Battle Axe Company) – Watchkeeper WK450

1st Aviation Brigade 
 1st Aviation Brigade
1 Regiment (RNAS Yeovilton) 
No. 652 Squadron – Wildcat AH1
 No. 659 Squadron – Wildcat AH1
 No. 661 Squadron – Wildcat AH1
 3 Regiment (Wattisham Airfield) 
No. 653 Squadron – Apache AH1
No. 662 Squadron – Apache AH1
No. 663 Squadron – Apache AH1
 4 Regiment (Wattisham Airfield)
No. 656 Squadron – Apache AH1
 No. 664 Squadron – Apache AH1
 5 Regiment (JHFS Aldergrove)
No. 665 Squadron – Gazelle AH1
 6 Regiment (Blenheim Camp, Bury St Edmunds)
No. 675 (The Rifles) Squadron
 No. 677 (Suffolk and Norfolk Yeomanry) Squadron
 No. 678 (The Rifles) Squadron
 No. 679 (The Duke of Connaught's) Squadron
7 Aviation Support Battalion, Royal Electrical and Mechanical Engineers (REME) (Wattisham Airfield)

Royal Navy 
Fleet Air Arm
 Commando Helicopter Force (RNAS Yeovilton)
 845 Naval Air Squadron – Merlin HC4/4A
 846 Naval Air Squadron – Merlin HC4/4A
 847 Naval Air Squadron – Wildcat AH1

Royal Air Force 

 Support Helicopter Force
No. 7 Squadron (RAF Odiham) – Chinook
No. 18 Squadron (RAF Odiham) – Chinook
No. 22 Squadron (JHC Operational Evaluation Unit) (RAF Benson)
No. 27 Squadron (RAF Odiham) – Chinook
No. 28 Squadron (Operational Conversion Unit) (RAF Benson) – Chinook HC4 and Puma HC2
No. 33 Squadron (RAF Benson) – Puma HC2
No. 230 Squadron (RAF Benson) – Puma HC2
Joint Helicopter Support Squadron (RAF Benson)
Tactical Supply Wing (MOD Stafford)

Senior Commanders
JHC is commanded by a two-star officer from either the Royal Navy, British Army or Royal Air Force.

Commander Joint Helicopter Command has been held by:

1999 – 2002 Air Vice-Marshal David Niven
2002 – 2005 Air Vice-Marshal Paul Luker
2005 – 2008 Major General Gary Coward
2008 – 2011 Rear Admiral Tony Johnstone-Burt
2011 – 2014 Air Vice-Marshal Carl Dixon
2014 – 2017 Major General Richard Felton
2017 – 2020 Rear Admiral Jonathan Pentreath
2020 – present Air-Vice Marshal Nigel Colman

See also

 List of Royal Air Force commands

References

Citations

Bibliography

External links
Official website not updated since 2014
Joint Helicopter Command – British Army
Joint Helicopter Command – Royal Navy

British military aviation
Helicopter units and formations
Joint military units and formations of the United Kingdom
Military units and formations established in 1999
Organisations based in Hampshire
1999 establishments in the United Kingdom